The Squash - Single Women competition at the World Games 1997 take place from 16 August to 17 August 1997 in Lahti in Finland.

Draw

Note: * w/d = Withdraw, * w/o = Walkover, * r = Retired

References

Men
Squash records and statistics
1997 in women's squash